Evans Lake or Lake Evans may refer to:

Evans Lake (British Columbia), Canada
Lake Evans (Quebec), Canada
Evans Lake (South Georgia), United Kingdom
Lake Evans (California), in Kern County, California, United States
Lake Evans (Riverside, California), near North Hill in Riverside, California, United States
Evans Lake (Powell County, Montana) in Powell County, Montana, United States
Evans Lake (Sanders County, Montana) in Sanders County, Montana, United States
Evans Lake (Ohio), United States
Evans Lake (Okanogan County, Washington), United States